Red Garland Live! is a live album by American pianist, composer and bandleader Red Garland which was recorded in 1959 and released on the New Jazz label. The album was recorded at the Prelude Club at the same concert that produced Lil' Darlin' and Red Garland at the Prelude.

Reception

The Allmusic site awarded the album 4½ stars. C. Michael Bailey from All About Jazz in reviewing the 2006 release of the complete Prelude recordings stated "There may be an argument that The Red Garland Trio at the Prelude is the last of the great Garland Trio recordings. The pianist performed and recorded sporadically until his death at 60 years old in 1984. But it is these Prelude sides illustrate Red Garland at top form in his craft".

Track listing
All compositions by Red Garland except where noted
 "Marie" (Irving Berlin) - 6:17  
 "Bohemian Blues" - 9:58  
 "One O'Clock Jump" (Count Basie) - 2:42
 "A Foggy Day" (George Gershwin, Ira Gershwin) - 5:36  
 "Mr. Wonderful" (Jerry Bock, George David Weiss) - 9:06
Recorded The Prelude Club in New York City on October 2, 1959

Personnel
Red Garland - piano
Jimmy Rowser - bass
Charles "Specs" Wright - drums

References 

1959 live albums
New Jazz Records live albums
Red Garland live albums
albums produced by Esmond Edwards